

Major events
The second administrative reform of 1719 was carried out by Peter the Great in order to fix the deficiencies of the original system. On June 9 (May 29 in the Julian calendar), 1719 Peter issued an ukase (edict) that abolished the division of the governorates into lots. Instead, most of the Governorates were divided into provinces (провинции), and provinces were further subdivided into districts (дистрикты). Provinces were governed by voyevodas. The idea of the subdivision of governorates into province was borrowed from the administrative division system of Sweden and other European countries.  Districts were introduced to replace the old system of subdivision into uyezds; however, the borders of the new districts did not match those of the old uyezds. The purpose of the districts was also different from that of the uyezds—population of each district was taxed to support military units assigned to it.

June 9 (May 29), 1719—Nizhny Novgorod Governorate was re-established.
June 9 (May 29), 1719—Revel Governorate was formed on the newly acquired Baltic lands.

Subdivisions (as of 1724)
Archangelgorod Governorate (Архангелогородская губерния)
subdivided into 4 provinces:
Archangelgorod Province (Архангелогородская провинция)
Galich Province (Галичская провинция)
Ustyug Province (Устюжская провинция)
Vologda Province (Вологодская провинция)
Astrakhan Governorate (Астраханская губерния)
not subdivided
Azov Governorate (Азовская губерния)
subdivided into 5 provinces:
Bakhmut Province (Бахмутская провинция)
Shatsk Province (Шацкая провинция)
Tambov Province (Тамбовская провинция)
Voronezh Province (Воронежская провинция)
Yeletsk Province (Елецкая провинция)
Kazan Governorate (Казанская губерния)
subdivided into 4 provinces:
Kazan Province (Казанская провинция)
Penza Province (Пензенская провинция)
Sviyaga Province (Свияжская провинция)
Ufa Province (Уфимская провинция)
Kiev Governorate (Киевская губерния)
subdivided into 4 provinces:
Belgorod Province (Белгородская провинция)
Kiev Province (Киевская провинция)
Oryol Province (Орловская провинция)
Sevsk Province (Севская провинция)
Moscow Governorate (Московская губерния)
subdivided into 9 provinces:
Kaluga Province (Калужская провинция)
Kostroma Province (Костромская провинция)
Moscow Province (Московская провинция)
Pereyaslavl-Ryazan Province (Переяславль-Рязанская провинция)
Pereyaslavl-Zalessk Province (Переяславско-Залесская провинция)
Suzdal Province (Суздальская провинция)
Tula Province (Тульская провинция)
Vladimir Province (Владимирская провинция)
Yuryevo-Polsk Province (Юрьево-Польская провинция)
Nizhny Novgorod Governorate (Нижегородская губерния)
subdivided into 3 provinces:
Alatyr Province (Алатырская провинция)
Arzamas Province (Арзамасская провинция)
Nizhny Novgorod Province (Нижегородская провинция)
Revel Governorate (Ревельская губерния)
not subdivided
Riga Governorate (Рижская губерния)
subdivided into 2 provinces:
Riga Province (Рижская провинция)
Smolensk Province (Смоленская провинция)
St. Petersburg Governorate (Санкт-Петербургская губерния)
subdivided into 11 provinces:
Belozersk Province (Белозерская провинция)
Narva Province (Нарвская провинция)
Novgorod Province (Новгородская провинция)
Petersburg Province (Петербургская провинция)
Poshekhonye Province (Пошехонская провинция)
Pskov Province (Псковская провинция)
Tver Province (Тверская провинция)
Uglich Province (Угличская провинция)
Velikiye Luki Province (Великолуцкая провинция)
Vyborg Province (Выборгская провинция)
Yaroslavl Province (Ярославская провинция)
Siberian Governorate (Сибирская губерния)
subdivided into 5 provinces:
Irkutsk Province (Иркутская провинция)
Sol-Kamsk Province (Соль-Камская провинция)
Tobolsk Province (Тобольская провинция)
Vyatka Province (Вятская  провинция)
Yenisei Province (Енисейская провинция)

1719-1724
1720s in Russia
1719 in Russia